Friedrich Engels (1820–1895) was a German communist, social scientist and philosopher.

Engels may also refer to:

People
 Engels (surname)
 Engels Gabbasov (1937–2014), Kazakh politician and writer
 Engels Kozlov (1926–2007), Soviet Russian painter
 Engels Pedroza (born 1966), Venezuelan former boxer

Other uses
 Engels (inhabited locality), several localities in Russia
 Engels Peak, Tajikistan
 Engels constituency, a Russian legislative constituency in the Saratov Oblast
 Engels Air Force Base, formerly Engels-2 (air base), a strategic bomber military airbase near Saratov, Russia
 Engels MI, a Russian floatplane/fighter developed in 1916
 Engels Teater, a historic theatre in Helsinki in Finland, active from 1827 to 1860
 Engels Copper Mine, a former mine in Plumas County, California

See also
Engle (disambiguation)
Engel (disambiguation)
Engels Maps
English language